Pujarin is a 1936 Hindi social film. It was directed by Prafulla Roy for International Film Craft. The film was based on a story by writer Sarat Chandra Chattopadhyay from his story "Dena Paona". The film was the remake of the Bengali film Dena Paona directed by Premankur Atorthy. The music direction was by Timir Baran with lyrics by Pandit Bhushan and Kidar Sharma.The film starred K. L. Saigal, Chandrabati Devi, K. C. Dey, Pahari Sanyal and Rajkumari. The story is about a reckless immoral youth who marries for money then deserts his wife due to circumstances, only to return as an aristocrat and reform through the love of his wife.

Plot
Jibanananda (K. L. Saigal) a selfish young criminally-minded man marries the rich Alaknanda (Chandra) for her money. With her help he changes and starts loving her. But his criminal activities catch up with him and he has to escape from the police leaving his wife behind. Several years pass and he returns as a rich aristocrat. The Pujarin (priestess) of the local temple who unknown to Jibananda is his wife, and he get into a conflict with each other as she does not approve of his high-handed ways with the local people. He realises who the priestess is and reforms his ways, finally uniting with his wife.

Cast
K. L. Saigal As Jibananda
Chandrabti Devi As Alaka
Pahari Sanyal
K. C. Dey
Shyam Laha
Rajkumari As Hemavati
Nawab
Babulal
Kailash
Jagdish
Kidar Sharma

Soundtrack 
The music direction was by Timir Baran and lyrics by Kidar Sharma. The popular K. L. song from this film Piye Ja Aur Piye Ja is said to have been recorded without any rehearsal. The composition for the music was a mix of Western orchestra with waltz and use of Raag Khamaj. The song seemed a  foreshadowing of Saigal's life and "enchanted listeners".

Song List

References

External links

1936 films
1930s Hindi-language films
Indian drama films
Hindi remakes of Bengali films
Indian black-and-white films
1936 drama films
Hindi-language drama films
Films scored by Timir Baran